Caicedonia is a town and municipality located in the Department of Valle del Cauca, Colombia, situated about 172 km from the capital Cali. Founded in 1910 by Daniel Gutierrez, Juan Bautista Angely and a group of settlers from Antioquia, Caldas, and Tolima, it was named after Lisandro Caicedo and became a municipality in 1923. Mostly mountainous, its economy is based on agriculture and commerce, its main exports are corn, coffee, sugarcane and bananas. Given its location on the border with the Quindío Department, only 35 km from that department's capital, Armenia, Caicedonia belongs ethnographically and culturally to the Paisa region.

External links
 Government of Valle del Cauca: Caicedonia
 Caicedonia official website

Municipalities of Valle del Cauca Department
1910 establishments in Colombia
Populated places established in 1910